Siboglinidae is a family of polychaete annelid worms whose members made up the former phyla Pogonophora and Vestimentifera (the giant tube worms). They can also be found in association with hydrothermal vents, methane seeps, sunken plant material, and whale carcasses.

The first specimen was dredged from the waters of what is now Indonesia in 1900. These specimens were given to French zoologist Maurice Caullery, who studied them for nearly 50 years.

Anatomy
They inhabit tubular structures composed of chitin and fixed to rocks or substrate. The tubes are often clustered together in large colonies.

Their bodies are divided into four regions. The anterior end is called the cephalic lobe, which bears from one to over 200 thin branchial ciliated tentacles, each with tiny side branches known as pinnules. Behind this is a glandular forepart, which helps to secrete the tube. The main part of the body is the trunk, which is greatly elongated and bears various annuli, papillae, and ciliary tracts. Posterior to the trunk is the short metamerically segmented opisthosoma, bearing external paired chaetae, which apparently help to anchor the animal to the base of its tube.

The body cavity has a separate compartment in each of the first three regions of the body, and extends into the tentacles. The opisthoma has a coelomic chamber in each of its five to 23 segments, separated by septa. The worms have a complex closed circulatory system and a well-developed nervous system, but as adults, siboglinids completely lack a mouth, gut, and anus.

Evolution
The family Siboglinidae has been difficult to place in an evolutionary context. After examination of genetic differences between annelids, Siboglinidae were placed within the order Polychaeta by scientific consensus. The fossil record along with molecular clocks suggest the family has Mesozoic (250 – 66 Mya) or Cenozoic (66 Mya – recent) origins. However, some fossils of crystallized tubes are attributed to early Siboglinidae dating back to 500 Mya. Molecular work aligning five genes has identified four distinct clades within Siboglinidae. The clades are Vestimentifera, Sclerolinum, Frenulata, and Osedax. These clades represent the four tracks evolution has followed within the Siboglinidae. Vestimentiferans live in vent and seep habitats. Separation of vestimentiferans into seep- and deep-sea-dwelling clades is still debated due to some phylogenies based on sequencing data placing the genera along a continuum. Sclerolinum is a monogeneric clade living on organic-rich remains. Frenulates live in organic-rich sediment habitats.  Osedax is a monogeneric clade specialized in living on whale bones, although recent evidence shows them living on fish bones as well.

Vestimentiferans
Like other tube worms, vestimentiferans are benthic marine creatures. Riftia pachyptila, a vestimentiferan, is known only from the hydrothermal vent systems.

Anatomy of vestimentiferans

Vestimentiferan bodies are divided into four regions: the obturaculum, vestimentum, trunk, and opisthosome. The main trunk of the body bears wing-like extensions. Unlike other siboglinids that never have a digestive tract, they have one that they completely lose during metamorphosis.

The obturaculum is the first anterior body part. It is possible that developmentally the obturaculum structures which in many tube worms include an organ to block the entrance to the tube is an outgrowth of the vestimentum rather than the first body segment.

The vestimentum, from which the group's name is derived, is a wing-like body part with glands that secrete the tube. In a ventroanterior position in the vestimentum is the brain which is postulated to be simpler than relatives that maintain a gut in the adult form. The opisthosome is the anchoring rear body part.

Vestimentiferan ecology
Their primary nutrition is derived from the sulfide-rich fluids emanating from the hydrothermal vents where they live. The sulfides are metabolized by symbiotic hydrogen sulfide- or methane-oxidizing bacteria living in an internal organ, the trophosome. One gram of trophosome tissue can contain one billion bacteria. How the worms instigate their relationship with the bacteria is not completely understood. The bacteria appear to colonize the host animal larvae after they have settled on a surface, entering them through their skin. This method of entry, known as horizontal transmission, means that each organism may have different species of bacteria assisting in this symbiosis. However, these bacteria all play similar roles in sustaining the vestimentiferans. Endosymbionts have a wide variety of metabolic genes, which may allow them to switch between autotrophic and heterotrophic methods of nutrient acquisition. When the host dies, the bacteria are released and return to the free-living population in the seawater.

Discovery of the hydrothermal vents in the eastern Pacific Ocean was quickly followed by the discovery and description of new vestimentiferan tubeworm species. These tubeworms are one of the most dominant organisms associated with the hydrothermal vents in the Pacific Ocean. Tubeworms anchor themselves to the substratum of the hydrocarbon seep by roots located at the basal portion of their bodies. Intact tubeworm roots have proven very difficult to obtain for study because they are extremely delicate, and often break off when a tubeworm is removed from hypothermal vent regions. How long the roots of the tube worms can grow is unknown, but roots have been recovered longer than 30 m.

A single aggregation of tubeworms can contain thousands of individuals, and the roots produced by each tubeworm can become tangled with the roots of neighbouring tubeworms. These mats of roots are known as "ropes", and travel down the tubes of dead tubeworms, and run through holes in rocks. The diameter and wall thickness of the tubeworm roots do not appear to change with distance from the trunk portion of the tubeworm's body.

Like the trunk portion of the body, the roots of the vestimentiferan tubeworms are composed of chitin crystallites, which support and protect the tubeworm from predation and environmental stresses. Tubeworms build the external chitin structure themselves by secreting chitin from specialized glands located in their body walls.

Genera
 Osedax
 Frenulata
 Birsteinia
 Bobmarleya
 Choanophorus
 Crassibrachia
 Cyclobrachia
 Diplobrachia
 Galathealinum
 Heptobrachia
 Lamellisabella
 Nereilinum
 Oligobrachia
 Paraescarpia
 Polybrachia
 Siboglinoides
 Siboglinum
 Siphonobrachia
 Spirobrachia
 Unibrachium
 Volvobrachia
 Zenkevitchiana
 Sclerolinum
 Vestimentifera
 Alaysia
 Arcovesia
 Escarpia
 Lamellibrachia
 Oasisia
 Ridgeia
 Riftia
 Tevnia

References

External links

Polychaetes
Chemosynthetic symbiosis
Annelid families